Hugo Rodríguez may refer to:

 Hugo Rodríguez Díaz (born 1957), Mexican politician
 Hugo Rodríguez (footballer, born 1959), Mexican football forward
 Hugo Rodríguez (footballer, born 1985), Mexican footballer defender
 Hugo Rodríguez (footballer, born 1989), Spanish footballer winger
 Hugo Rodríguez (footballer, born 1990), Mexican football defender
 Hugo Rodriguez (footballer, born 1991), French football midfielder
 Hugo F. Rodriguez, American diplomat

See also
 Hugo Rodrigues (born 1979), Portuguese footballer